There are a number of Elementary schools named King Elementary School:

 King Elementary School (Santa Ana, California)
 King Elementary School (Colorado Springs, Colorado)
 King Elementary School (King, North Carolina) 
 King Elementary School (Woodbridge, Virginia) 
 King Elementary School (Green Bay, Wisconsin)